Çeltik can refer to:

 Çeltik
 Çeltik, Biga
 Çeltik, Keşan